Elsner+Flake is a trademark used by German type foundry originally called EF Designstudios but later renamed Elsner+Flake Type Consulting GmbH and is currently based in Hamburg. The company was founded in 1986 by Veronika Elsner and Günther Flake after their ten-year freelance experience in type design, typography and digitizing of fonts and logos.

The collection of digital fonts by Elsner+Flake numbers more than 2500. The fonts are available in Mac PostScript, PC PostScript, PC TrueType and Plain OpenType.

References

External links
 Elsner+Flake Type Consulting GmbH

Type foundries
Companies based in Hamburg
Manufacturing companies of Germany